The Arizona state elections of 2006 were held on November 7, 2006. All election results are from the Arizona Secretary of State's office.

The deadline for signing petition signatures to appear on the primary ballot for all races was June 14, 2006.

This article does not yet include complete information about the state propositions placed on the ballot, but major propositions for Arizona in 2006 included:
 An attempt to add language to the AZ Constitution that would declare a marriage as only between a man and a woman (did not pass; as of 2006, AZ is the only state to reject a same-sex marriage ban proposed to its voters, though an amendment to the state constitution passed in 2008)
 Two competing statewide smoking bans—one sponsored by R.J. Reynolds Tobacco Co. and one sponsored by various health organizations. (The health orgs' Prop 201 passed and will ban smoking in all indoor locations except some tobacco shops and some fraternal organizations)
 Four propositions that affected illegal immigrants, including ones that would make English the official language of Arizona, and restrict some currently held rights of illegal immigrants.

Federal

United States Senate

United States House

State
Races for Governor of Arizona, Attorney General of Arizona, Secretary of State of Arizona, State Treasurer, Superintendent of Public Instruction, State Mine Inspector, and two seats on the five-member Corporation Commission will be decided. All races except for the State Mine Inspector, State Treasurer, and one seat on the Corporation Commission feature incumbents running for re-election.

Governor

Attorney General 
Democratic incumbent Terry Goddard, the former mayor of Phoenix, Arizona, ran for a second four-year term after winning his first in 2003. He was challenged by Republican Bill Montgomery, former prosecutor of Maricopa County.

Secretary of State 
Republican incumbent Jan Brewer, the former chair of the Maricopa County Board of Supervisors, ran for a second four-year term, after winning her first term in 2002. She was challenged by Democrat Israel Torres, the former Arizona Registrar of Contractors and a businessman and attorney, and Libertarian Ernest Hancock, a talk radio producer, real estate agent, and restaurant owner.

Superintendent of Public Instruction
Republican incumbent Tom Horne ran against Democratic challenger Jason Williams.

State Treasurer 
Republican incumbent Dean Martin ran against Democratic challenger Rano Singh.

State Mine Inspector
Republican incumbent Joe Hart, a former state representative and businessman, ran for reelection uncontested.

Corporation Commissioner
Two seats on the Arizona Corporation Commission are up for re-election. Republican incumbents Kris Mayes and Gary Pierce ran for the seats, challenged by Democrats Richard Boyer and Mark Manoil. Libertarian Rick Fowlkes also ran for the position.

Legislative Department

All 60 seats in the Arizona House of Representatives and all 30 seats in the Arizona Senate will be up for election. There are five incumbents not seeking re-election to the seats they currently hold, and eight races in which there is only one candidate for election.

Judicial Department

When a vacancy occurs on the bench, a Judicial Nominating Committee approves the names of at least three applicants for nomination, from which the Governor appoints one to the position. After appointment, all Judges and Justices are subject to judicial election retentions, statewide for Justices and in their separate districts for Judges. Supreme Court Justices serve a six-year term; all other state Judges serve four-year terms. There is a mandatory retirement age of 65 for all judicial offices.

Ballot propositions

See also
 2006 United States gubernatorial elections
 2006 Arizona state legislature elections

References

 
Arizona